Der Hofrat Geiger is a 1947 Austrian film directed by Hans Wolff, based on the musical of the same name by Martin Costa. It is significant for being one of the first Heimatfilme released after the Second World War, and very successful.

Synopsis 
Franz Geiger, a retired councillor, discovers that he has a daughter, Mariandl, the result of a love affair in Spitz eighteen years earlier with a woman named Marianne Mühlhuber. As a result of this, he travels to Spitz with his servant Ferdinand.

Cast 
 Paul Hörbiger: Franz Geiger
 Maria Andergast: Marianne Mühlhuber
 Hans Moser: Ferdinand Lechner
 Waltraut Haas: Mariandl
 Josef Egger as Old Windischgruber
 Hermann Erhardt: Mathias Pfüller
 Louis Soldan: Hans

See also
Mariandl (1961)

References

External links 
 https://www.imdb.com/title/tt0039467/
 https://www.bfi.org.uk/films-tv-people/4ce2b6ac711cd

1947 films
1940s German-language films
Films directed by Hans Wolff
Austrian comedy films
1947 comedy films
Austrian black-and-white films